Laurance Rudic (born 10 September 1952) is a British theatre artist best known for his long association as a leading member of the Glasgow Citizens Theatre company - 1972-1996.

For 34 years, (1969–2004) 'The Citz' as it came to be known, was run by a trio of maverick geniuses - Giles Havergal, Philip Prowse and Robert David MacDonald. Under this triumvirate the company quickly gained fame and notoriety for its glamorous and ofttimes outrageously decadent European-style treatment of rarely performed European and English classics. New works such as Camille, Chinchilla, A Waste of Time and Webster were regularly written for the company by resident playwright, dramaturge and translator, R. D. McDonald. For many years, the Citz was proving-ground and creative home to young actors who eschewed existing English literary and mechanistic acting conventions in order to develop their own highly passionate and individualistic approach. Famous actors who started their careers there include Tim Curry, Pierce Brosnan, Gary Oldman, Rupert Everett, Sean Bean, Tim Roth, Celia Imrie and Ciarán Hinds.

Rudic was born into a musical, theatrical family in Glasgow, Scotland. His father was a violinist, his mother a semiprofessional opera 0singer, and his aunt was the Scottish actress and broadcaster Edith Ruddick.

Career
Rudic began acting in amateur dramatics at an early age and working as a dresser when he was twelve years old in Jimmy Logan's Metropole Theatre in Glasgow. This early experience of the world of variety and music hall, created a deep and enduring fascination with the potential of theatre as a space for expressing the raw immediacy of human existence beyond conventional approaches to acting in text-based theatre. Intent on becoming an actor, he left school at the age of 15 and worked as an office boy at the BBC. While acting in a staff play he was chosen by director, Pharic McLaren, to play the name role in The Boy Who Wanted Peace (1969), part of the BBC's Wednesday Play series.

Rudic completed three years of formal actor training at the Royal Scottish Academy of Music and Drama in Glasgow (1969–1972). At the same time he began performing in the physical theatre of Lindsay Kemp - mime, dancer, and teacher of singer David Bowie. Rudic likens Kemp's approach to a theatre of the heightened senses in which intuition and spontaneity within the moment of the performance play a major role. His time with Kemp was a living education in the corporeal mime of Étienne Decroux, Marcel Marceau, and the classical Japanese theatre of Noh and Kabuki, in which time is non-linear and of the present moment.

His work with Kemp in Flowers based on the novel Our Lady of the Flowers by Jean Genet and Woyzeck by George Buchner at the Traverse Theatre in Edinburgh, led to his being accepted as a member of the newly-established Citizens Theatre Company. At that time (1972) he was one of only three Scots actors to be accepted into the young group who were predominantly English. Rudic continued to work there intermittently for almost a quarter of a century until 1996.

Travels in the East
Throughout his years at the Citz, Rudic travelled frequently to cultures beyond Europe in order to understand more about holistic process in the oral performance tradition. In 1975, on his first visit to the Dalai Lama's refugee headquarters-in-exile in the Himalayas, he was invited by the Dalai Lama's private office to teach acting to the young refugee performers of the Tibetan Institute of Performing Arts (T.I.P.A.) who were preparing for the first Tibetan cultural tour of Europe and the Americas. IN 1978, he also experienced life as a Kathakali acting student at the leading school for Kathakali actors in Kerala, South India - the Kerala Kalamandalum. These travels and others in cultures with strong oral traditions in music, dance and storytelling (Iran, Egypt, Afghanistan, Pakistan, Morocco),contributed greatly to an understanding of his own intuitive process.

In 2000, intent on developing himself as a ‘stand-up’ theatre artist, he was awarded a Ford Foundation Grant to travel to Egypt and observe the dying tradition of epic storytelling. As part of his research, he based himself with El Warsha Theatre Company, a group of young Egyptian actors, dancers and singers, working in downtown Cairo. Through the company he came to know the old generation of traditional performance artists such as Sayed El Dawy the improvising epic storyteller from Upper Egypt, and Hassan Khanufa, a traditional street performer and Aragoz puppeteer from Cairo, who died in 2005 at the age of 74.

Recent projects

In 2006, working with Scottish theatre practitioner Andrew McKinnon, he returned from Cairo to Glasgow to perform a solo improvising "Stand-Up Theatre" piece - And God Created - at his old theatre, 'The Citz'. The entertainment, improvised around a theme of autobiographical stories about acting and travel, deals with universal themes such as Time, the search for identity beyond society and culture, and the role of thought and memory in consciousness.

In October 2008, he returned once again to Glasgow, this time to direct and feature in The Parade, an early work by the American playwright, Tennessee Williams. The actors were encouraged to work within the action through an ongoing use of sensory awareness. There was no fixing of character and throughout the twelve performances, the life between the text was always in a state of flux, which meant that each night was considerably different from the other. This was the European and UK premiere of the work which was played at the Glasgow Citizens Theatre in the Circle Studio.

During his years in Egypt, he has continued to refine and expand his Somatic approach to consciousness in theatre in which the actor works out of a dual extemporising reality as both storyteller and story.

Theatre

Royal Scottish Academy of Music and Drama
 Traditional/James Bridie 'Punch and Judy/The Baikie Charivari' Frederick Robbins 'Beadle/Policeman/Mr Copper' 1970  
Anton Chekhov Uncle Vanya Colin Chandler Vanya 1971	
William Shakespeare King Lear Peter De Souza The Fool 1972

Giles Havergal's Glasgow Citizens Theatre Company

1971
 Jean Genet The Balcony Giles Havergal The Tramp
1972–1973
 Shakespeare Timon of Athens Keith Hack Lucullus Abbey TheatreFestival
 Molière Tartuffe Giles Havergal M. Loyal Edinburgh International Festival
 Peter Weiss Marat/Sade Steven Dartnell Karl
 Miles Rudge/John Gould Puss in Boots Giles Havergal Puss
 Christopher Marlowe Tamburlaine the Great Keith Hack Celebinus Edinburgh International Festival
 Nikolai Gogol The Government Inspector Robert David McDonald Bobchinski
 Jack Gelber The Connection Steven Dartnell Leech

1973–1974
 Bertolt Brecht Happy End RD McDonald Wilbur
 John Whiting The Devils Havergal Mannoury
 Miles Rudge/John Gould Dick Whittington Havergal King Rat
 Shakespeare The Taming of the Shrew Havergal Baptista (Hamburg Festival)
 Robert David McDonald Camille RD McDonald Dr Korev
 Edward Bond Early Morning Prowse Disraeli
 Bertolt Brecht Saint Joan of the Stockyards McDonald Criddle
 Shakespeare Coriolanus Scicinius

1974–1975
 Arthur Kopit Indians Malcolm McKay Chief Joseph of the Nez Percés
 Tennessee Williams Camino Real Prowse Esmeralda
 Nikolai Gogol The Government Inspector McDonald Inspector Of Schools
 John Webster The Duchess of Malfi Prowse Rodrigo (Belgrade, Ljubljana, Zagreb)
 Shakespeare Romeo and Juliet David Hayman Benvolio
 Robert David McDonald The De Sade Show RD McDonald The Bishop

1975–1976
 Shakespeare Hamlet Prowse Rosencrantz
 Falkland Cary Sailor Beware Havergal Carnoustie Bligh
 Robert David McDonald The De Sade Show Prowse Madame de Martaine
 Carlo Goldoni Mirandolina McDonald Conte de Albafiorita
 Georg Büchner Woyzeck McDonald Karl

1981–1982
 John Byrne Babes in the Wood Havergal Friar Tuck
 Robert David McDonald Chincilla Prowse Socrate (Amsterdam, Rotterdam, The Hague)
 Robert David McDonald A Waste of Time Prowse Jupien (Caracas International Theatre Festival)
 Shakespeare Hamlet McDonald Rossencraft/Player King
 John Dryden Marriage à la mode Havergal Alexas
 Bertolt Brecht Mr Puntila and his Man Matti Havergal The Attaché

1982–1983
 Jean Genet The Balcony Prowse The General
 Jean Genet The Screens Prowse The Arab Voice Prowse
 Jean Genet The Blacks Prowse The General
 Philip Massinger The Roman Actor Aretinus
 Seán O'Casey Red Roses for Me Havergal Rev. Clinton
 Bertolt Brecht The Mother McDonald Rybin
 Carlo Goldoni The Impresario of Smyrna McDonald Ali the Impresario (Turin Festival)
 Shakespeare The Merchant of Venice Prowse Gratiano (Turin Festival)
 George Bernard Shaw Arms and the Man Havergal Major Petkoff
 Marquis de Sade The Philosophy of the Boudoir Prowse Dolmance (Festival Di Parma)
 Noël Coward Sirocco Prowse Angelo
 Robert David McDonald Webster McDonald Jeeper

1983–1984
 Karl Kraus The Last Days of Mankind McDonald A Man of Iron (Edinburgh International Festival)
 Hugo von Hofmannsthal Der Rosenkavalier Prowse Herr von Faninal (Edinburgh International Festival)
 Seán O'Casey Juno and the Paycock Havergal Needle Nugent
 Thomas Southerne Oroonoko Prowse Aboan
 Noël Coward Private Lives Prowse Louis
 Ernst Toller The Machine Wreckers Havergal Jim Cobbitt
 Jean-Paul Sartre Altona McDonald Franz
 Oliver Goldsmith She Stoops to Conquer Havergal Diggory
 Oscar Wilde A Woman of No Importance Prowse Mr Kelvill MP
 Rolf Hochhuth  McDonald Tiresius
 Jacques Offenbach French Knickers (La Vie parisienne) Prowse Bob

1986
 Oscar Wilde An Ideal Husband Prowse Vicomte De Nanjac
 Rolf Hochhuth The Representative McDonald The Doctor

1987
 Friedrich Schiller Joan of Arc McDonald Charles VII
 Richard Brinsley Sheridan The School for Scandal McDonald

1988
 John Ford 'Tis Pity She's a Whore Prowse Friar Bonaventura
 Oscar Wilde Lady Windermere's Fan Prowse Cecil Graham
 William Congreve The Way of the World McDonald

1989
 Ben Jonson The Alchemist McDonald Face
 Friedrich Schiller Mary Stuart Prowse Lord Burleigh
 Charles Dickens (adaptation) A Tale of Two Cities Prowse Dr Manette

1990
 Bertolt Brecht Mother Courage Prowse Cook (Mermaid Theatre)with Glenda Jackson
 Nicholas Rowe Jane Shore Prowse Richard III

1991
The Rivals
 Eugene O'Neill Mourning Becomes Electra Prowse Ezra/Orin
 Noël Coward Design for Living Prowse Ernest (Theatre Royal Richmond)

1992
 Frank Wedekind Lulu John Pope Dr Goll/Casti-Piani
 Craig Raine 1953 Prowse Eberhard
 Bertolt Brecht Edward II Prowse Edward II/III Prowse

1996
 Eugene O'Neil Long Day's Journey into Night Stewart Laing James Tyrone

WORKS AS GUEST ARTIST AT CITIZENS THEATRE:

2006
 Laurance Rudic And God Created... solo work created by Laurance Rudic. Creative Advisor Andrew McKinnon

2008
Tennessee Williams The Parade Laurance Rudic Don European and UK premiere

Other theatre

Traverse Theatre Edinburgh 1971Woyzeck by Georg Buchner (Lindsay Kemp Company) Karl
Guildford Theatre Royal 1973
Shakespeare Measure for Measure (Robert David McDonald) Abwhoreson
Welsh National Theatre 1976
Carlo Goldoni It Happened in Venice (Ian Stewart) Beppe
Shaw Theatre London 1976
Shakespeare Romeo and Juliet (James Rhoose-Evans) Friar Lawrence
Derby Playhouse 1977
Shelagh Delaney A Taste of Honey (Patrick Lau) Geoffrey
Royal Court 1979
The Young Writer's Festival - Six new Plays directed by Philip Hedley
7:84 Scotland 1980/81
 John McGrath Blood Red Roses (John McGrath) John (Scottish Tour and Theatre Royal Stratford East)
 Ena Lamont Stewart Men Should Weep (Giles Havergal) Alex (Scottish Tour)
Scottish Theatre Company 1981
Tom McGrath Animal (Kenny Ireland)
Ian McKellen-Edward Petherbridge Company at Royal National Theatre (Paris, Aberdeen, Chicago) 1985/86
Richard Brinsley Sheridan The Critic (Sheila Hancock) Mr Hopkins
John Webster The Duchess of Malfi (Philip Prowse) Death
Anton Chekhov The Cherry Orchard (Mike Alfreds) Trofimov
Mermaid Theatre London 1990
Bertolt Brecht Mother Courage (Philip Prowse) Cook		
Richmond Theatre London 1991
Noël Coward Design for Living (Philip Prowse) Ernest
Almeida Theatre London 1993
 Aleksander Griboyedov Chatsky (Jonathan Kent) Mr D
Edinburgh Festival The Assembly Hall 1995
 Alasdair Gray Lanark (Tony Graham) Lanark
Pitlochry Festival Theatre 1996Travels with My Aunt stage play by Giles Havergal adapted from the novel by Graham Greene (Richard Baron) O'Toole et al.
Robert McLellan The Flouers o Edinburgh (Clive Perry) Nabob
Agatha Christie And Then There Were None (Joan Knight) Captain Lombard
James Bridie Mr Bolfrey (Joan Knight) Cohen

Film and TV

BBC
George Friel The Boy Who Wanted Peace 1969 The Wednesday Play Pharic McLaren Percy PhinnThe Spirit of Asia India documentary BBC 1978 directed by Michael McKintyre
 Dennis Potter Blackeyes Dennis Potter Commercials Director BBC2Breast Is Best Manager BBC2 1989	Poppylands Johnny BBC2 1989In Between the Lines Gilan

STVJourney's End Raleigh directed by Tina WakerellMartha Doctor directed by Tina WakerellDr. Finlay's Casebook Sewell

FILMDefence of the Realm 1985 Charlie directed by David DruryBeing Human Solus 1992 directed by Bill ForsythSavage Play Christopher Sykes 1994Ring of Truth Priest	Knights Muslim Chronicler 1997The Guest'' by Albert Camus Monsieur Daru

References

External links
Theatre Scotland

Website
Scottish Theatre Archives
National Theatre Archive
Laurance Rudic website including notes, photographs and reviews on his time at Giles Havergal's Glasgow Citizens Theatre between the years 1971-1996

Scottish male stage actors
Living people
1952 births
Scottish male film actors
Scottish male television actors